Bičakčić ( is a family surname, commonly found in Bosnia and Herzegovina. It is derived from the Turkish word bıçakçı, meaning "cutler" or "knife-maker". It may refer to:

Ermin Bičakčić (born 1990), Bosnian footballer
Edhem Bičakčić (1884-1941), mayor of Sarajevo (1928–29; 1935–39)

Bosnian surnames